Pakistan Blind Cricket Council (PBCC) is the governing body of blind cricket in Pakistan. It was founded in 1997, and is a founding member of the World Blind Cricket Council (WBCC), and a full member of Pakistan Cricket Board (PCB).

It controls and manages all the tours and matches undertaken by Pakistan blind cricket team. It also promotes blind cricket at domestic level, and provides regular rehabilitation to the players.

Syed Sultan Shah is the current Chairman of the PBCC, having been in office since 2009. He also serves as the President of the WBCC.

History 
In August 1996, the first International Conference was held for blind cricket in Delhi, India, in which seven countries participated. The World Blind Cricket Council was formed then with Pakistan as one of its founding members.

In May 2018, the PBCC announced the formation of the national women team for the first time. Around a 100 players were registered for the trials ahead of the team's debut series against Nepal.

Affiliated clubs 
As of 2017, the following 16 clubs are affiliated with PBCC:

References

External links 
 
 PBCC at the ESPNcricinfo
 

Cricket administration in Pakistan
Sports governing bodies in Pakistan
Cricket administration
Blind cricket administration
Parasports organisations in Pakistan